A number of notable people have the O'Grady surname:

 Brittany O'Grady, American actress
 Chris O'Grady, English footballer
 Dónal O'Grady, Irish hurler and manager
 Frances O'Grady, General Secretary of the British Trades Union Congress
 Gail O'Grady, American actress
 George Edward O'Grady, Canadian ice hockey player
 Graeme O'Grady, Australian rugby league footballer
 John O'Grady, Australian writer
 Kieren O'Grady, field hockey player from New Zealand
 Lani O'Grady, American actress and talent agent
 Lorraine O'Grady, American conceptual artist
 Mac O'Grady, American professional golfer
 Mary O'Grady, American editor and columnist
 Oliver O'Grady, former Roman Catholic priest and convicted child molester
 Paul O'Grady (born 1955), English comedian and television personality 
 Paul O'Grady, Australian footballer
 Peter O'Grady, American Executive Manager for the Computer Department of Minnesota Colleges
 Rohan O'Grady, pen name of Canadian novelist June O'Grady (Skinner)
 Scott O'Grady, former US air force pilot and survivor
 Sean O'Grady, former lightweight champion boxer
 Seán O'Grady, Irish politician
 Standish O'Grady, 1st Viscount Guillamore, politician and lawyer
 Standish O'Grady, 2nd Viscount Guillamore, British Army officer and Waterloo veteran
 Standish James O'Grady, Irish author, journalist and historian
 Stuart O'Grady, Australian professional cyclist
 Terry O'Grady, British rugby league footballer

Fictional characters
 George O'Grady, fictional character played by George Carlin on The George Carlin Show
 Toxteth O'Grady, fictional character from British comedy show The Young Ones

O'Grady
OGrady